James A. Mulvey was the co-owner of the Brooklyn / Los Angeles Dodgers of the National League from  through  with his wife, Dearie Mulvey.  In 1938, he inherited his share of the club from his father-in-law Stephen McKeever's estate.  In 1950, Walter O'Malley assumed majority control of the Dodgers.  The Mulvey's minority share was purchased by O'Malley in 1975, 17 years after the team moved from Brooklyn to Los Angeles. Mulvey was also at one point president of Samuel Goldwyn Productions, for which he worked for from 1923, retiring in 1960.

Mulvey died at Vero Beach, Florida in 1973 after recent years of declining health, where he had a winter home. He was buried in Brooklyn after a funeral was held in White Plains.

References

External links
Los Angeles Dodgers owners

1899 births
1973 deaths
Brooklyn Dodgers executives
Brooklyn Dodgers owners
Los Angeles Dodgers owners
Major League Baseball owners